Henrik Anders (Henka) Gustafsson (born 14 August 1970 in Sköllersta, Sweden) is an international Motorcycle speedway rider who won the 1993 World Pairs Championship with Tony Rickardsson and the Speedway World Team Cup with Sweden in 1994 and 2000. Early in his career Gustafsson was known as much for his long, curly blonde hair as he was his riding, though his riding soon outshone his locks.

Career

Sweden
Henrik Gustafsson, who has ridden for Indianerna in the Swedish Elite League since 1986, is a two time Swedish Speedway Champion, winning the title in 1995 and 2000. He also won the Swedish Pairs Championship in 1994 and is a four time (1986-1989) Swedish Under-21 Champion.

United Kingdom
Gustafsson first rode in the British Elite League in 1990 for the King's Lynn Stars, staying with the team until 1993 before moving on to the Belle Vue Aces for 1994. He then took a seven-year break from riding in the British leagues until he returned for a season with Belle Vue. He moved once more in 2002 to the Poole Pirates before missing the 2003 and 2004 seasons while riding overseas. He then returned for one last season in Britain with the Oxford Cheetahs in 2005, winning the Craven Shield while with Oxford.

Poland
Gustafsson's first season riding in the Polish top division was 1992 with KS Toruń. He then rode for WTS Wrocław in 1993, helping them to become Polish League Champions before signing with Zielona Góra for 1994. Gustafsson then signed with Polonia Bydgoszcz in 1995 and stayed with them until 2001, again winning the Polish League in 1997, 1998 and 2000. He left Bydgoszcz for Wybrzeże Gdańsk in 2002, staying for a single season before his last season in Poland (2003) with Warsaw.

International
Gustafsson rode in four Speedway World Finals during his career. He failed to qualify for the 1990 World Final in Bradford, England, but got a lucky break when he replaced the injured Dane Jan O. Pedersen. Supposed to be one who was "there for the experience" in his first World Final, Henka impressed many by finishing a surprise 6th in the Final, winning two of his five rides. In fact, after his first 3 rides he was in equal first place with eventual winner and fellow Swede Per Jonsson and Australia's Todd Wiltshire (who would finish 3rd and was also in his first World Final) on 8 points. Unfortunately he then finished last in his next race and could only manage 3rd in his final race to finish with 9 points.

In January 1991, Gustafsson toured Australia with the Swedish team alongside Per Jonsson, Jimmy Nilsen, Peter Nahlin, Eric Stenlund, Conny Ivarsson and Tony Rickardsson. The Swedes defeated the Aussies 3-2 in a five match series. One night on the tour after a night out, Gustafsson's team mates cut off his long hair, something he was reportedly not happy about.

Gustafsson qualified for the 1992 World Final in Wrocław, Poland where he improved to finish 5th, again winning two of his five rides. He improved again in the 1993 World Final in Denmark, finishing 4th and winning 3 of his rides. In the 1994 World Final, the last before the Speedway Grand Prix series started in 1995, Gustafsson finished in 7th place winning only one of his rides.

Henrik Gustafsson would then ride in the speedway Grand Prix series as a regular rider from 1995 until 2000, finishing a best 5th overall in both 1996 and 1997. His best placings in one of the Grand Prix events was a 2nd in Sweden in 1996 and a second as a Wild Card rider in the 2001 German GP.

Personal
Henrik Gustafsson's son, Simon (born 25 May 1990) has followed in his father's footsteps and has become a speedway rider also, currently riding for the Eastbourne Eagles in Britain and TŻ Start Gniezno in Poland.

World final Appearances

Individual World Championship
 1990 -  Bradford, Odsal Stadium - 6th - 9pts
 1992 -  Wrocław, Olympic Stadium - 5th - 9pts
 1993 -  Pocking, Rottalstadion - 4th - 10pts
 1994 -  Vojens, Speedway Center - 7th - 9pts

World Pairs Championship
 1991 -  Poznań, Olimpia Poznań Stadium (with Per Jonsson / Jimmy Nilsen) - 2nd - 24pts (9)
 1992 -  Lonigo, Pista Speedway (with Per Jonsson / Tony Rickardsson) - 3rd - 22pts (8)
 1993 -  Vojens, Speedway Center (with Tony Rickardsson / Per Jonsson) - Winner - 26pts (6)

World Team Cup
 1988 -  Long Beach, Veterans Memorial Stadium (with Conny Ivarsson / Tony Olsson / Jimmy Nilsen / Per Jonsson) - 3rd - 22pts (4)
 1991 -  Vojens, Speedway Center (with Tony Rickardsson / Per Jonsson / Jimmy Nilsen / Peter Nahlin) - 2nd - 30pts (7)
 1992 -  Kumla, Kumla Speedway (with Tony Rickardsson / Per Jonsson / Jimmy Nilsen / Peter Nahlin) - 2nd - 33pts (12)
 1993 -  Coventry, Brandon Stadium (with Peter Karlsson / Per Jonsson / Tony Rickardsson / Peter Nahlin) - 3rd - 28pts (6)
 1994 -  Brokstedt, Holsteinring Brokstedt (with Tony Rickardsson / Mikael Karlsson) - Winner - 23pts (11)
 1995 -  Bydgoszcz, Polonia Bydgoszcz Stadium (with Tony Rickardsson / Peter Karlsson) - 4th - 19+2 pts (4)
 2000 -  Coventry, Brandon Stadium (with Tony Rickardsson / Mikael Karlsson / Peter Karlsson / Niklas Klingberg) - Winner - 40+3 pts (10)

Individual Under-21 World Championship
 1988 -  Slaný, AK Slaný speedway - 2nd - 11+3 pts
 1989 -  Lonigo, Pista Speedway - 4th - 11 pts

Speedway Grand Prix results

World Longtrack Championship

 1985 - Semi-final
 1985 -  Pfarrkirchen 11pts (7th)
 1985 -  Mühldorf 9pts (9th)
 1985 -  Marianske Lazne 9pts (9th)
 1985 - Semi-final

References

1970 births
Living people
Swedish speedway riders
Speedway World Pairs Champions
Polonia Bydgoszcz riders
Belle Vue Aces riders
Oxford Cheetahs riders
Poole Pirates riders
King's Lynn Stars riders
Expatriate speedway riders in Poland
Swedish expatriates in Poland
Individual Speedway Long Track World Championship riders